Pita is a 2012 Bangladeshi film directed by Masud Akhond. It stars Masud Akhond, Jayanta Chattopadhyay, Shamima Nazneen, Shaina Amin, Bonna Mirza, Sumon Kalyan and many more. It released on 28 December 2012 in Bangladesh. It also premiered on 5 May 2013 at the Wilshire theater of Beverly Hills, LA.

Plot Summary
Nitai, the head of the Hindu community in the village, called a meeting on the news that the Pakistani military could come to the village at any time. Jalil, the only Muslim blacksmith in the village, came out of the house saying this to his sheltering father Bishu. The meeting is also being held at the house of Mr. Jamadar. He does not want Pakistan to be different. Bipin is a bit worried and he wants to leave the country quickly. But his son Sharat does not agree. He wants to fight for the country. Also his wife is introverted. You can't go anywhere far with him.  Sharmili is Nitai's daughter. Widowed a few days ago. He loves Jalil's daughter and is very fond of Jalil's family.

One day a wild boar entered the village. Everyone is shouting about him. At night, when the possibility of delivery of autumn wife Pallavi arose, she brought the midwife Kamala Masi. At that time the Pak military also attacked the village. Sharat escapes with his father and pregnant wife. But when he went to fetch the midwife's bag, he was caught. Her father rushed to her rescue and the Pakistani army killed both of them. Many more like them died at their hands. Although Jalil survived with his sons, the military captured his daughter, Sharmili, and a few other girls. Jalil tries hard to save the girl.

Cast 
 Masud Akhond as Jalil - A courageous father who tried his best to save his children.
 Jayanta Chattopadhyay as Bipin
 Shamima Nazneen
 Kalyan Corraya 
 Shaina Amin
 Bonna Mirza
 Bakhtiar Zaman Bhuiyan

Music

The music of this film was directed by Sayan Wahid and Emon Saha and lyrics were penned by Rabindranath Tagore, Bishu Shikder, Sayan Wahid and Masud Akhand.

Awards

National Film Awards - 2012
 Best Music Director - Emon Saha

Bachsas Awards - 2012
 Best Actor - Masud Akhond

References

2012 films
Bengali-language Bangladeshi films
Bangladeshi war drama films
Films based on the Bangladesh Liberation War
Films set in 1971
2012 war drama films
Films scored by Emon Saha
2010s Bengali-language films
Films directed by Masud Akhond
2012 drama films
Impress Telefilm films